The Rose Trellis egg is a jewelled enameled Imperial Fabergé egg made in Saint Petersburg, Russia under the supervision of the jeweler Peter Carl Fabergé in 1907, for Tsar Nicholas II of Russia. It was presented by Tsar Nicholas II to his wife, the Empress Alexandra Feodorovna, on  Easter (April 22) 1907. It is now in the Walters Art Museum in Baltimore, Maryland.

Design 
The egg was created by Faberge's workmaster, Henrik Wigström (Finnish, 1862–1923) and is crafted of gold, green and pink enamel in various shades, portrait diamonds, rose-cut diamonds and satin lining. This egg is enamelled in translucent pale green and latticed with rose-cut diamonds and decorated with opaque light and dark pink enamel roses and emerald green leaves. A portrait diamond is set at either end of this egg, the one at the base covering the date "1907". Unfortunately the monogram has now disappeared.  The egg contained as a surprise a diamond necklace and an ivory miniature portrait of the tsarevich framed in diamonds which is now lost.  Only an impression on the satin lining now remains.  The egg is approximately 7.7 cm in height.

Ownership 
Tsar Nicholas II purchased the egg as a gift to his wife, Tsarina Alexandra Fyodorovna.  The April 21, 1907 invoice indicated the egg cost 8,300 rubles.  In 1920, the egg was in the possession of Alexandre Polovtsov, who was a former employee at Gatchina Palace and later started an antique shop in Paris. It is not known how Polovtsov acquired the Egg.  In 1930, the egg was sold  along with the 1901 Gatchina Palace egg to Henry Walters and became a part of the Walters Art Museum Collection in 1931. In 1936, the egg was exhibited along with the Gatchina Palace egg at the Walters Art Museum, Baltimore, Maryland and has been on permanent exhibition since 1952.

See also 
 Objet d'art

References

Sources

External links 

 A detailed article on the Rose Trellis Egg from wintraecken.nl

1907 works
Imperial Fabergé eggs
Collection of the Walters Art Museum, Baltimore